The Geraldine Fibbers were an alt-country band founded in 1994 by Carla Bozulich.  Initially, band members included Bozulich, Daniel Keenan, Julie Fowells, William Tutton and Kevin Fitzgerald. While Bozulich had previously been known for noisy industrial music, The Geraldine Fibbers fused American roots music and blues-influenced punk.

The group always incorporated noise and experimentation into their sound, which has been mis-labeled as Alternative Country. In early 1996, Keenan departed, to be replaced by Nels Cline, the band shifting to an even more noisy, guitar-rock sound.  

Spin magazine named Lost Somewhere Between the Earth and My Home and Butch to their top albums of 1995 and 1997 lists, respectively.

Moss joined A Silver Mt. Zion in 2001. The Nels Cline Singers and an enormously diverse biography surround Nels Cline. In 2004 he joined the alternative band, Wilco. Fitzgerald has played with Eleni Mandell, The Circle Jerks and others. William Tutton has played with Brian Grillo, plays with Glenn Meadmore and does occasional recording for friends. Bozulich made her 4th album for her group, Evangelista on Constellation Records.  

In April 2017, it was announced that Lost Somewhere Between the Earth and My Home would be reissued on vinyl by Jealous Butcher Records on May 5, 2017. The reissue will be mixed for vinyl by Steve Fisk and include "Bitter Honey" and "234" from the original sessions, a previously unreleased studio version of "You Doo Right" featuring both Keenan and Cline on guitar, and a new song "Thank You For Giving Me Life" featuring Bozulich, Tutton, Fitzgerald, Cline and Moss as the lineup.

Discography

Singles
"Marmalade/Get Thee Gone" (Live) – 7" (1994, Hut/Virgin)
"Dragon Lady" – CDS (1995, Hut/Virgin)
"Dragon Lady/Birthday Boy" – 7" (1995, Sympathy For The Record Industry)
"Fancy/They Suck" – 7" (1995, Big Jesus)
"Marmalade" – Promo CDS (1995, Virgin)
"House Is Falling (Remix)" – Promo CDS (1995, Virgin)
"California Tuffy" – Promo CDS (1997, Virgin) – 2 different versions exist
"California Tuffy/Folks Like Me" – Promo 7" (1997, Virgin)

 "Din Din Goes to Space" (Live) – 7" (1994, Hut/Philippines)

Albums & EPs
"Get Thee Gone" – 10" EP (1994, Sympathy For The Record Industry)
"The Geraldine Fibbers" – CDEP (1994, Hut)
"The Geraldine Fibbers" – Promo CDEP (1995, Virgin) – it doesn't have an actual title, sometimes you can see it listed as "G Fibbers" or "Bitter Honey"
Lost Somewhere Between the Earth and My Home – CD (1995, Virgin)
Live From the Bottom of the Hill – Promo CD (1996, Virgin)
Butch – CD (1997, Virgin)
Butch – 2xLP (1997, Sympathy For The Record Industry)
What Part of Get Thee Gone Don't You Understand? – CD (1997, Sympathy For The Record Industry)
Lost Somewhere Between the Earth and My Home – Record Store Day LP reissue with bonus tracks (2015, Jealous Butcher)

Compilations
"The Poop Alley Tapes" – track "He Stopped Loving Her Today" (1995, WIN Records)
"Definitivt Beat Nr 10-95" – track "Get Thee Gone" (1995, Beat (Magazine))
"All Over Me OST" – track "Dragon Lady" (1997, TVT)
"Alright, This Time Just The Girls" – edited version of "Toybox" (1999, Kill Rock Stars)
"Drinking From Puddles: A Radio History" – live version of "Butch" (1999, Kill Rock Stars)
"Jackson's Jukebox" – track "Butch" (2000, Kill Rock Stars)
"Root Damage" – track "She's a Dog" (2003, Sympathy For The Record Industry)

Videos
"Dragon Lady"
"California Tuffy"

References

 Ashare, M. (1997), "Country cousin + 'Butch', The Geraldine Fibbers' second album". Artforum 36 (1): 29 Sep 1997.

External links

Thee Geraldine Fibbers Shrine
Band history from Perfect Sound Forever

American alternative country groups
Sympathy for the Record Industry artists
Musical groups established in 1994
Punk blues musical groups
1994 establishments in California